Traffic with the Devil is a 1946 American short documentary film about traffic problems in Los Angeles, directed by Gunther von Fritsch. It was nominated for an Academy Award for Best Documentary Short.

Plot summary

Cast
 Charles Reineke as Narrator (as Police Sgt. Charles Reineke)
 Ben Hall as Out-of-Gas Motorist (uncredited)
 Ralph Montgomery as Motorist (uncredited)
 Eva Puig as Driver of Ford Deluxe Convertible (uncredited)
 Jason Robards Sr. as Irate Motorist (uncredited)
 Ray Spiker as Irate Motorist, Honking Horn (uncredited)

References

External links
 
 
 

1946 films
1946 documentary films
1946 short films
Black-and-white documentary films
American short documentary films
American black-and-white films
1940s short documentary films
Metro-Goldwyn-Mayer short films
Documentary films about road transport
Documentary films about Los Angeles
Transportation in Los Angeles
Films directed by Gunther von Fritsch
1940s English-language films
1940s American films